Zostera is a small genus of widely distributed seagrasses, commonly called marine eelgrass, or simply seagrass or eelgrass, and also known as seaweed by some fishermen and recreational boaters including yachtsmen. The genus Zostera contains 15 species.

Ecology
Zostera marina is found on sandy substrates or in estuaries, usually submerged or partially floating. Most Zostera are perennial. Short stems grow up from extensive, white branching rhizomes. The flowers are enclosed in the sheaths of the leaf bases; the fruits are bladdery and can float.

Zostera beds are important for sediment deposition, substrate stabilization, as substrate for epiphytic algae and micro-invertebrates, and as nursery grounds for many species of economically important fish and shellfish. Zostera often forms beds in bay mud in the estuarine setting. It is an important food for brant geese and wigeons, and even (occasionally) caterpillars of the grass moth Dolicharthria punctalis.

The slime mold Labyrinthula zosterae can cause the wasting disease of Zostera, with Z. marina being particularly susceptible, causing a decrease in the populations of the fauna that depend on Zostera.

Zostera is able to maintain its turgor at a constant pressure in response to fluctuations in environmental osmolarity. It achieves this by losing solutes as the tide goes out and gaining solutes as the tide comes in.

Distribution

The genus as a whole is widespread throughout seashores of much of the Northern Hemisphere as well as Australia, New Zealand, Southeast Asia and southern Africa. The discovery of Z. chilensis in 2005 adds an isolated population on the Pacific coast of South America to the distribution. One species (Z. noltii) occurs along the land-locked Caspian Sea.

Uses
Eelgrass has been used for food by the Seri tribe of Native Americans on the coast of Sonora, Mexico. The rhizomes and leaf-bases of eelgrass were eaten fresh or dried into cakes for winter food. It was also used for smoking deer meat. The Seri language has many words related to eelgrass and eelgrass-harvesting. The month of April is called xnoois ihaat iizax, literally "the month when the eelgrass seed is mature".

Zostera has also been used as packing material and as stuffing for mattresses and cushions.

On the Danish island of Læsø it has been used for thatching roofs. Roofs of eelgrass are said to be heavy, but also much longer-lasting and easier to thatch and maintain than roofs done with more conventional thatching material.
More recently, the plant has been used in its dried form for insulation in eco-friendly houses and as a ground cover in permaculture gardens, once its salt layer washed off (ex: Friland, Danish eco-village).

In the United States, eelgrass insulation was commercially marketed in the early 1900s as Cabot's Quilt by the Samuel Cabot Co of Boston.  However, due to an outbreak of Labyrinthula zosterae which destroyed crops of eelgrass, combined with the collapse of the homebuilding industry due to the great depression, it went out of production and was replaced in new homes with fiberglass (introduced in the late 1930s).

Some studies show promise for eelgrass meadows to sequester atmospheric carbon to reduce anthropogenic climate change.

Zostera can also be utilized to produce biomass energy using the Jean Pain method.

Species
Accepted species
 Zostera angustifolia (Hornem.) Rchb. – Russian Far East, British Isles, Denmark, Sweden
 Zostera asiatica Miki – Russian Far East, Japan, Korea, NE China
 Zostera caespitosa Miki – Russian Far East, Japan, Korea, NE China
 Zostera capensis Setchell – Madagascar; Kenya to Cape Province
 Zostera capricorni Ascherson  – New Guinea, Australia, New Zealand
 Zostera caulescens Miki – Russian Far East, Japan, Korea, NE China
 Zostera chilensis (J. Kuo) S. W. L. Jacobs & D. H. Les – Chile
 Zostera japonica Ascherson & Graebner – Russian Far East, Japan, Korea, China, Vietnam
 Zostera marina L. – shores of North Pacific, North Atlantic, British Isles Mediterranean, Black Sea, Sea of Okhotsk 
 Zostera mucronata den Hartog – Australia
 Zostera muelleri Irmisch ex Ascherson – Australia
 Zostera nigricaulis (J.Kuo) S.W.L.Jacobs & D.H.Les – Australia
 Zostera noltii Hornem. – shores of Northeastern Atlantic, Mediterranean, Black Sea, Caspian Sea
 Zostera novazelandica Setchell – New Zealand
 Zostera polychlamys (J.Kuo) S.W.L.Jacobs & D.H.Les – Australia
 Zostera tasmanica Martens ex Ascherson – Australia

References

External links

 Flora Europaea: Zostera
 Flora of North America: Zostera
 Flora of China: Zostera species list
 Wasting disease of Zostera 
 Historical Changes of Eelgrass in Buzzards Bay, MA (USA) 
 Long Island's Seagrass conservation website, Seagrass.LI

 
Alismatales genera
Biota of the Atlantic Ocean
Biota of the Pacific Ocean
Biota of the Indian Ocean
Biota of the Caspian Sea
Salt marsh plants
Taxa named by Carl Linnaeus